Bedřich Slaný (born 20 January 1932) is a former international speedway rider from Czechoslovakia.

Speedway career 
Slaný reached the final of the Speedway World Team Cup in the 1962 Speedway World Team Cup. He was three times Continental Speedway Finalist in 1960, 1961 and 1962.

World final appearances

World Team Cup
 1962 -  Slaný (with Bohumír Bartoněk / Karel Průša / Jaroslav Volf / Luboš Tomíček Sr.) - 4th - 16pts (4)

References 

1932 births
Czech speedway riders
Living people